Three Chimneys is a historic house in Virginia, United States.

Three Chimneys may also refer to:
Three Chimneys Archaeological Site, remains of sugar-processing plant in Florida, United States
Three Chimneys Farm, stud farm in Kentucky, United States
Three Chimneys, Kent, hamlet in Kent, England
The Three Chimneys, restaurant in Skye, Scotland
The Three Chimneys (Tuolumne County, California), landform in California